All Saints' Church, is in Childwall, Liverpool, England.  It is recorded in the National Heritage List for England as a designated Grade I listed building, and is the only medieval church remaining in the Metropolitan borough of Liverpool. It is an active Anglican parish church in the diocese of Liverpool, the archdeaconry of Liverpool and the deanery of Liverpool South – Childwall.

History

The chancel dates from the 14th century, and the south aisle and porch are probably from the 15th century.  Additions were made in the 18th century and the tower and spire date from 1810 to 1811.  The north aisle dates from 1833 and it was partly rebuilt between 1900 and 1905. There are two chapels; the Plumbs' Chapel on the north side is dated 1716 and on the south side the Salisbury pew (formerly Isaac Green's Chapel) dates from 1739 to 1740.  A restoration of the church was carried out by W. Raffles Brown in 1851–53.  The rebuilding of the north aisle was by James F. Doyle and he added a vestry in 1905–06. Between 1987 and 1991 the external fabric of the church was restored and in 1994 the clock was also restored.

Structure

The church is built in red sandstone. Its plan consists of a west tower, a nave with a clerestory, a chancel, a south aisle and a much wider north aisle which extends to the north of the chancel, and a south porch.  A chapel projects from the north aisle and another from the south aisle.  The tower has a large two-light window, a clock on three faces and two-light bell-openings.  The spire is recessed behind an openwork parapet with gargoyles. Internally there are three arcades with octagonal columns and double-chamfered arches.  The chancel is at a lower level than the nave. A gallery extends across the west end of the nave and the south aisle.  The chancel roof is wagon-vaulted. Attached to the west wall of the porch is a fragment of a Saxon cross-shaft and in the east wall of the chancel is a Norman capital, which is set horizontally.

Fittings and furniture

Inside the church are box pews which were installed in the restoration of 1851–53.  The choir stalls date from the early 20th century; they were designed by Bodley and Scott and had been intended for the Lady Chapel of Liverpool Cathedral.  In a display case is an elaborately carved bench end dating probably from the early 17th century.  The brass chandelier in the nave is dated 1737 and there are two copies of it dated 1892 in the chancel.  The church contains a total of 12 hatchments and a number of benefactor and charity boards.  The stained glass includes windows by William Warrington, by Kempe, by Heaton, Butler and Bayne, by Percy Bacon and by Mary Lowndes.  In the south aisle are two funerary recesses which contain memorials to the Norris family of Speke Hall. In the south wall of the chancel are the remains of a 14th-century piscina. The north chancel aisle contains an enamelled brass by Warrington to the memory of Major W. Pitcairn Campbell who died in 1855. There is a ring of six bells which were cast in 1912 by John Warner & Sons.

External features

The churchyard contains the graves of John Charles Ryle, the first Anglican Bishop of Liverpool, and his wife, and the grave of the poet William Watson, as well as Commonwealth War Graves Commission graves of six service personnel of World War I, and five of World War II. Against the south wall of the churchyard is an elaborate pedimented arch which is a memorial to Sir Andrew Barclay Walker and his wife. Also in the churchyard is a sandstone hearse house dated 1811 which is a Grade II listed building.

In media
The church is regularly used as a filming location in the Hollyoaks soap opera. Actress Nikki Sanderson performed a stunt, involving her regular character of Maxine Minniver, at the top of the church tower on 10 April 2015.

See also

Grade I listed churches in Merseyside

References

External links

History of All Saints Church

14th-century church buildings in England
Churches in Liverpool
Grade I listed buildings in Liverpool
Grade I listed churches in Merseyside
Anglican Diocese of Liverpool
Church of England church buildings in Merseyside
English Gothic architecture in Merseyside